Elvia Reyes (born 12 June 1956) is a Honduran fencer. She competed in the women's individual foil event at the 1992 Summer Olympics.

References

External links
 

1956 births
Living people
Honduran female foil fencers
Olympic fencers of Honduras
Fencers at the 1992 Summer Olympics